Merimetsa (Estonian for "Sea Forest") is a subdistrict in the district of Põhja-Tallinn, Tallinn, the capital of Estonia. It is mostly covered by the park forest Merimets (Sea Forest; also known as Stroomi Forest, derived from the nearby Stroomi Beach). Merimetsa has a population of 4.

Gallery

References

Subdistricts of Tallinn